Estonian Youth Song and Dance Festival is an Estonian youth festival which encompasses both song and dance events. This youth festival is a mini-variant of Estonian Song and Estonian Dance Festival. This youth festival takes place in Tallinn, Estonia and the festival is organized by Estonian Song and Dance Celebration Foundation.

First festival took place from 30 June – 1 July 1962.

In 2017, XII Festival took place.

References

Music festivals in Estonia